Duraisamypuram is a village in the Tenkasi district of Tamil Nadu. It is located between the towns of Sankarankovil and Surandai.

References 

Villages in Tenkasi district